Saint Victorian of Asan (in Aragonese San Beturián) (died ca. 560 AD) was a Spanish saint.  A native of Italy, he founded monasteries and hospices there before settling briefly in France.

He became the founder and abbot of the monastery of Asan (now called San Vitorián). Asan was situated in the Aragonese Pyrenees, in the diocese of Barbastro.

He died of natural causes.

He is mentioned by Venantius Fortunatus.

External links
Saints of January 12: Victorian of Asan
Patron Saints: Victorian of Asan
 Viktorian av Asan
 San Vitorián de Asan

Medieval Spanish saints
560 deaths
6th-century Christian saints
Year of birth unknown
6th-century people of the Visigothic Kingdom
Medieval Italian saints